Serigne Abdou (28 February 1995 – 27 September 2016) was a Qatari footballer of Senegalese descent who  played for Al Khor as a defender. He also played for the Qatar youth team.

Club career
Abdou graduated from Aspire Academy in 2013. He made his league debut with Al Khor 19 November 2012 against Al Gharafa at the age of 17.

Club career statistics
Statistics accurate as of 24 May 2014

1Includes Emir of Qatar Cup.
2Includes Sheikh Jassim Cup.
3Includes AFC Champions League.

Death
Serigne died of cancer on 27 September 2016 aged 21.

References

1995 births
2016 deaths
Al-Khor SC players
Qatari footballers
Qatar Stars League players
Association football defenders
Qatari people of Senegalese descent
Aspire Academy (Senegal) players